The Zagreb Funicular is the funicular in Zagreb, Croatia, operated by ZET, situated in Tomić Street, connecting Ilica (Donji Grad) with Strossmayerovo šetalište (Strossmayer promenade) to the north (Gornji Grad).
Its  track makes it one of the shortest public-transport funiculars in the world.

History
In 1888 a certain D.W. Klein won a concession to build  in Zagreb a funicular. The funicular was built and put into operation in 1890. The funicular was propelled by a steam engine. Initially, the steam pressure was so low, and repairs were so frequent, that it remained out of operation nearly half of the time.  In 1934 its steam propulsion was replaced by an electric motor.

In 1969 operation of the funicular was suspended due to security reasons: its systems were worn out. The renovation works have lasted for four and half years. The funicular was put back in operation on July 26, 1974. 

Having in mind that it kept its original shape, constructional and most of the technical properties, it was given legal protection as a monument of culture.

Technical characteristics
The funicular has two cars for 28 passengers each (16 seated and 12 standing places). Its rides are scheduled every 10 minutes every day from 6:30 to 24:00.

Each can carry . The electrical engine is in the northern (upper) station. This makes it one of the shortest, but also one of the steepest funiculars in the world.

See also 
 List of funicular railways

References

External links 

 Funicular, Zagrebački holding, ZET

Funicular railways in Croatia
Funicular
Donji grad, Zagreb
Gornji Grad–Medveščak
Funicular
1200 mm gauge railways in Croatia
Railway lines opened in 1893